Oz Day 10K Wheelchair Road Race is held on Australia Day in The Rocks, Sydney and is marquee event on the international wheelchair racing calendar, attracting prominent international and Australian athletes.

History
The inaugural race was held in 1990 around Centennial Park in Sydney amongst traffic travelling around the Park. The inaugural race was the brainchild of Peter Trotter and Jeff Wiseman, two prominent wheelchair racers that trained at the Park. Trotter a former 10 km road racing champion had competed in similar events throughout the world. Their philosophy in creating the event was for disabled children to see elite wheelchair athletes in competition. Sixty five athletes including sixteen international and eighteen interstate athletes competed. Australian cricketer Mike Whitney started the race and New South Wales Premier Nick Greiner and record breaking aviator Gaby Kennard presented the winners prizes which included prize money. Over one thousand spectators watched the event.

The race was moved to the Sydney Rocks area in 1991 and consisted of two 5 km laps. Over the years, the organisers have encountered difficulties as major city roads need to be closed. The race in normally held early in the morning to overcome the difficulties of road closures.

The race is supported by the Australia Day Council and Sydney City Council and managed by Wheelchair Sports NSW. It is now an iconic event in Sydney on Australia Day.

Results

Prominent international and Australian athletes have competed in the event and prize money is awarded. At the completion of the 2018 event, Kurt Fearnley had won the race eleven times and Louise Sauvage ten times.

Senior Events

Junior and Masters Events

 2021 event entries impacted by COVID-19 international and interstate restrictions.

References

External links
 Oz Day Race Results – Wheelchair Sports NSW
 Celebrating 25 Years of the Oz Day 10K – Video

Wheelchair racing
Annual sporting events in Australia
Sports competitions in Sydney
Recurring sporting events established in 1990
Athletics competitions in Australia
1990 establishments in Australia